Kemangkon is a district within the Purbalingga Regency of Central Java.

Economy 
The economy of Kemangkon is dominated by farming and factory.

Demographics 
Kemangkon has a population of ~56,084 people, of which 97% are Banyumasan and use the traditional Banyumasan language. The majority of the inhabitants work as farmers.

Geography 
Kemangkon is located on Mount Slamet at the highest point within the Purbalingga Regency. It is located in the tropical forest of the region, with the Serayu and Klawing rivers running through it.

The district is home to 20 individual villages:

 Bakulan
 Bokol
 Cengis
 Gambarsari
 Jetis
 Kalialang
 Karangkemiri
 Karangtengah
 Kedungbenda
 Kedunglegok
 Kemangkon
 Majasem
 Majatengah
 Muntang
 Panican
 Pegandekan
 Pelumutan
 Senon
 Sumilir
 Toyareka

Points of attraction 
Several sites sacred to the  Kemangkon Banyumasan religion are located in or near Kemangkon, including
 Mount Kidul
 Serayu River
 Klawing River

References

Districts of Central Java